A voltage controller, also called an AC voltage controller or AC regulator is an electronic module based on either thyristors, triodes for alternating current, silicon-controlled rectifiers or insulated-gate bipolar transistors,  which converts a fixed voltage, fixed frequency alternating current (AC) electrical input supply to obtain variable voltage in output delivered to a resistive load. This varied voltage output is used for dimming street lights, varying heating temperatures in homes or industry, speed control of fans and winding machines and many other applications, in a similar fashion to an autotransformer. Voltage controller modules come under the purview of power electronics. Because they are low-maintenance and very efficient, voltage controllers have largely replaced such modules as magnetic amplifiers and saturable reactors in industrial use.

Modes of operation
Electronic voltage controllers work in two different ways; either through "on-and-off control" or through "phase control".

On-and-off control 
In an on-and-off controller, thyristors are used to switch on the circuits for a few cycles of voltage and off for certain cycles, thus altering the total RMS voltage value of the output and acting as a high speed AC switch. The rapid switching results in high frequency distortion artifacts which can cause a rise in temperature, and may lead to interference in nearby electronics. Such designs are not practical except in low power applications.

Phase angle control

In phase angle control, thyristors are used to selectively pass only a part of each AC cycle through to the load. By controlling the phase angle or trigger angle, the output RMS voltage of the load can be varied. The thyristor is turned on for every half-cycle and switched off for each remaining half-cycle. The phase angle is the position at which the thyristor is switched on.

Applications

 Light dimming circuits
 Temperature control of electrical heating systems
 Speed control of motors 
 AC magnet controls

See also

 Dimmer
 Motor soft starter
 DC injection braking
 Space Vector Modulation
 Variable-speed air compressor
 Vector control (motor)
 Motor controller
 Adjustable-speed drive
 Electronic speed control
 Variable-frequency drive
 Thyristor drive
 DC motor starter section of Electric motor

References

Power electronics